Englitazone is a hypoglycemic agent of thiazolidinedione (glitazone) class.

See also 
 Ciglitazone
 Darglitazone
 Netoglitazone
 Troglitazone
 Rivoglitazone—currently in clinical trials
 Pioglitazone, lobeglitazone, rosiglitazone—the only ones currently in clinical use

References 

Chromanes
Thiazolidinediones